The 2005 Austrian Open was a men's tennis tournament played on outdoor clay courts. It was the 35th edition of the Austrian Open, and was part of the International Series Gold of the 2005 ATP Tour. It took place at the Kitzbühel Sportpark Tennis Stadium in Kitzbühel, Austria, from 25 July until 31 July 2005. Third-seeded Gastón Gaudio won the singles title.

Finals

Singles

 Gastón Gaudio defeated  Fernando Verdasco 2–6, 6–2, 6–4, 6–4
 It was Gaudio's 5th title of the year and the 8th of his career.

Doubles

 Leoš Friedl /  Andrei Pavel defeated  Christophe Rochus /  Olivier Rochus 6–2, 6–7(5–7), 6–0
 It was Friedl's 6th title of the year and the 11th of his career. It was Pavel's 1st title of the year and the 2nd of his career.

References

External links
 ATP tournament profile
 ITF tournament edition details

Austrian Open (tennis)
Austrian Open Kitzbühel
2005 in Austrian tennis